Atheta pilicornis is a species of beetles belonging to the family Staphylinidae.

It is native to Europe.

References

Staphylinidae